Mattia El Hilali (born 20 January 1998) is an Italian professional footballer who plays as a midfielder for Gubbio.

Club career

Milan
He is a product of Milan youth teams. On 16 July 2016, he made his first appearance for Milan's senior squad in a pre-season friendly against Bordeaux. He also appeared in the 2016 International Champions Cup game against Bayern Munich on 27 July 2016.

In the subsequent season, he appeared on the bench once on 13 February 2017, in a Serie A away game against Lazio.

Loan to Matera
On 31 August 2018, he joined Serie C club Matera on loan for the 2018–19 season.

He made his Serie C debut for Matera on 6 October 2018, in a game against Bisceglie, as a 74th-minute substitute for Manuel Ricci.

On 29 January 2019, El Hilali returned from loan at Matera.

Chiasso
On 24 February 2019, El Hilali signed with Swiss club Chiasso until 30 June 2021.

Gubbio
On 12 August 2019, he signed a 2-year contract with Gubbio.

International
El Hilali was born in Italy to a Moroccan father and Italian mother. He was the starter for Italy in the 2015 UEFA European Under-17 Championship, in which Italy finished in 5th place.

References

External links
 

1998 births
Living people
Footballers from Milan
Italian footballers
Italy youth international footballers
Italian people of Moroccan descent
Italian sportspeople of African descent
Association football midfielders
A.C. Milan players
Matera Calcio players
FC Chiasso players
A.S. Gubbio 1910 players
Serie C players
Swiss Challenge League players
Italian expatriate footballers
Expatriate footballers in Switzerland